Changyŏn station is a railway station in Changyŏn-ŭp, Changyŏn County, South Hwanghae Province, North Korea. It is the terminus of the Changyŏn Line of the Korean State Railway.

History
Changyŏn station was opened by the Chosen Railway on 21 January 1937, along with the rest of the Sugyo–Changyŏn section of the former Changyŏn Line.

References

Railway stations in North Korea